Baizhifang Subdistrict is a subdistrict on the southwest part of Xicheng District, Beijing, China. As of 2020, it has a total population of 82,022.

This subdistrict got its name due to its historical status as a paper manufacturing hub. In 1272, the Ministry of Rites set up Baizhifang as a producer of paper for government usage, and the surrounding area got the same name as the institution.

History

Administrative Division 
As of 2021, there are a total of 19 communities within the subdistrict:

References 

Xicheng District
Subdistricts of Beijing